The Missouri Historical Society was founded in St. Louis on August 11, 1866. Founding members created the historical society "for the purpose of saving from oblivion the early history of the city and state".

Organization 
The Missouri Historical Society operates the Missouri History Museum in St. Louis' Forest Park, as well as the Library and Research Center.  Admission to the museum and library are free to the public.

Library and Research Center 
The Library and Research Center  houses a regional history collection documenting St. Louis, the Mississippi and Missouri Valleys, the Louisiana Purchase Territory, and the American West.  The Library and Research Center collections include:
 Library Collections 
 Manuscript Collections 
 Photographs and Prints 
 Architecture Collections 
 Broadcast Media Archives 
 Museum Collections

No appointment is needed to view the library and manuscript collections, but might be needed for other collections. Among its unique collections are the 301 freedom suits of the 19th-century St. Louis Circuit Court Records, the largest group of such case files in the country.  These have been scanned into a searchable database that is online for researchers. They document the slaves' petitions for freedom under state law before the American Civil War.

The research library is housed in a historic 1927 Byzantine revival synagogue building erected by the United Hebrew Congregation on Skinker Boulevard. (The congregation has moved to Chesterfield where it erected a new building.)

Programming 
The Missouri Historical Society offers programs and outreach services, including traveling exhibitions, tours, theatrical and musical presentations, programs for school classes and youth groups, family festivals, special events, workshops, and lectures.

History 
In 1952, the Missouri Historical Society was involved in efforts to lobby the U.S. government to create commemorative coins for the 150th anniversary of the Louisiana Purchase.

References

External links 
 
 Digitized copy of The Universal Exposition of 1904 by David R. Francis
 Lewis and Clark: The National Bicentennial Exhibit
 The 1904 World's Fair: Looking Back at Looking Forward

History of Missouri
Byzantine Revival architecture in Missouri
Historical societies in Missouri